Pasig Catholic College, also referred to as PCC, is a private Catholic coeducational basic and higher education institution located in Pasig, Philippines and was founded by CICM fathers in 1913. It is considered as the central catholic educational institution and the cathedral school of the Diocese of Pasig and a part of the Pasig Diocesan School System and the Manila Archdiocesan Parish and School Administration.

PCC, situated in the heart of Pasig, in Malinao, the College had a humble beginning. Founded in 1913 as "Escuela Catolica" by Rev. Pierre Cornelis De Brouwer, CICM, Its first functional lone building was the "Bahay Paaralan" built in 1931. PCC was then an exclusive school for boys, currently it is now an coeducational institution and is considered the largest catholic school in the Diocese of Pasig.

The College was granted Level 3 accreditation by the Philippine Accrediting Association of Schools, Colleges and Universities or PAASCU in the Elementary department, High School Department while the College Department was granted Level 2 including the College of Secondary Education, College of Elementary Education, and College of Business Administration.

Pasig Catholic College celebrated its centennial anniversary in 2013.

History

It was founded in 1913 as a small school managed by the CICM Fathers headed by Fr. Pierre Cornelis De Brouwer, CICM inside the "convento" (convent) of the Immaculate Conception Parish (now the Immaculate Conception Cathedral in Pasig). It is the first school in Pasig.

During the Japanese occupation in 1942-1945, the classrooms and corridors were used by the Japanese to store garrisons, during this time as well a bomb was implanted under the main campus before.

The old college building was destroyed because of the earthquake with an estimated magnitude of 7.7 that happened in 1990.

On June 26, 2006, The Philippine Marketing Awards Institute, The Asian Institute of Marketing and Entrepreneurship, and The Marketing Insights Magazine recognized and awarded Pasig Catholic College as the “Most Outstanding Catholic School” in Pasig.

Developments
In 1994 the old wooden college building was replaced by a concrete five-storey Administration Building. The building housed the high school and college classrooms as well as administrative offices. At the same time, a new school cafeteria was constructed in front of the high school building. The following year, a coeducational program was offered to the first two years of grade school and high school levels.

Academics 

 Kindergarten
 Grade School
 Junior High School
 Senior High School  
 STEM (Science, Technology, Engineering and Mathematics)  
 ABM (Accountancy, Business and Management)
 GAS (General Academic Strand)  
 HUMMS (Humanities and Social Sciences) 
 AD (Arts and Design)
 College 
 College of Secondary Education
 BS Secondary Education, Major in English
 BS Secondary Education, Major in Mathematics
 BS Secondary Education, Major in Filipino
 BS Secondary Education, Major in Science
 BS Secondary Education, Major in Religious Education
 College of Elementary Education
 BS Elementary Education with specialization in Early Childhood Education and General Education
 College of Business Administration
 BS in Business Administration, Major in Marketing Management
 BS in Business Administration, Major in Human Resource Development Management
 BS in Entrepreneurship
 College of Psychology
 BS in Psychology
 College of Information Technology
 BS in Information Technology
 College of Accountancy
 BS in Accountancy
 College of Communication Arts and Journalism
 AB in Communication
 AB in Journalism
 Special Programs
 Certificate in Teaching Program for Non-Education Graduate
 LET Review Program for CITP and Education graduates
 School of Graduate Studies
 Masters in Education
 Masters in Educational Management
 TESDA Accredited Technical-Vocational Programs
 Cookery NC II
 Bread and Pastry Production NC II
 Caregiving NC II

Accreditation and recognition
The Grade School Department was granted re-accreditation for five (5) years during the PAASCU Formas Visit on February 7-8, 2005. On the other hand, the High School Department was granted re-accreditation for five (5) years retroactive during the PAASCU visit on September 5-6, 2005. On June 26, 2006, The Philippine Marketing Awards Institute, The Asian Institute of Marketing and Entrepreneurship and the Marketing Insights Magazine recognized and awarded Pasig Catholic College as the "Most Outstanding Catholic School" in Pasig.

The College Department Underwent a Preliminary Visity by the PAASCU on September 4-5, 2006. The PAASCU team's visit focused on the college department's Education and Business Administration programs.

The PAASCU Consultancy visit for the College Department was held on August 8, 2008, focusing on the area of the faculty.

The Centennial Wall of Legacy 
The Centennial Wall of Legacy, located at Pasig Catholic College’s main entrance, is a commemorative mural displaying the rich and colorful history and achievement of PCC as it reached its centenary milestone. The PCC Centennial Wall of Legacy was established by the PCC Alumni Association Inc.

Gallery

References

External links

 

Educational institutions established in 1913
Universities and colleges in Pasig
Catholic elementary schools in Metro Manila
Catholic secondary schools in Metro Manila
Catholic universities and colleges in Metro Manila
1913 establishments in the Philippines